Waldeck may refer to:

Places

Canada
 Waldeck, Nova Scotia, rural community in Nova Scotia, Canada
 Waldeck, Saskatchewan, a village in Saskatchewan, Canada

Europe
 Free State of Waldeck-Pyrmont, a constituent state of the Weimar Republic
 Principality of Waldeck and Pyrmont, a principality in the German Empire and German Confederation, and a state in the Weimar Republic
 Waldeck, Palatinate, a village in the Upper Palatinate, Bavaria, Germany
Waldeck Castle (Upper Palatinate), the remains of a castle near the village
 Waldeck Castle (Hunsrück), a medieval fortress/castle in Rhineland-Palatinate, Germany
 Waldeck-Eisenberg, a medieval principality of the Holy Roman Empire
 Waldeck-Frankenberg, a Kreis (district) in the north of Hesse, Germany
 Waldeck, Hesse, a town in Hesse, Germany
 Waldeck Castle (Waldeck), a medieval fortress/castle in Waldeck, Hesse, Germany
 Waldeck, Moselle, a hamlet in Lorraine, France
 Waldeck Castle (Lorraine), a medieval fortress/castle in Éguelshardt, Lorraine, France
 Waldeck, historical German name of Orava Commune in Estonia
 Waldeck, The Hague, a neighbourhood in The Hague
 Waldeck, Thuringia, a small municipality in Thuringia, Germany

United States
 Waldeck, Kansas, a ghost town in Kansas, United States
 Waldeck, Pennsylvania, an unincorporated community in Pennsylvania, United States
 Waldeck, Texas, an unincorporated community in Texas, United States

People
 Adolf II of Waldeck (c 1250–1302), count of Waldeck and prince bishop of Liège
 Benedict Waldeck, deputy in the Prussian National Assembly
 Christian, Count of Waldeck-Wildungen (1585–1637), Count of Waldeck-Eisenberg and Count of Waldeck-Wildungen
 Christian August, Prince of Waldeck and Pyrmont (1744–1798), general in the Austrian service, and last Commander and Field Marshal of the Portuguese land army
 Christian Louis, Count of Waldeck (1635–1706), Count of Waldeck-Wildungen and Count of Waldeck and Pyrmont
 Count Ludwig Joseph von Boos-Waldeck (1798–1880), German noble who promoted the settling of Texas by Germans
 Emma of Waldeck and Pyrmont (1858–1934), Queen Consort and Regent of the Netherlands
 Franz von Waldeck (1491–1553), Prince-Bishop of Münster, Osnabrück, and Minden
 Friedrich Anton Ulrich, Prince of Waldeck and Pyrmont (1676–1728), first reigning Prince of Waldeck and Pyrmont
 Friedrich Karl August, Prince of Waldeck and Pyrmont (1743–1812), Prince of Waldeck and Pyrmont
 Friedrich, Prince of Waldeck and Pyrmont (1865–1946), the last reigning Prince of the German state of Waldeck and Pyrmont
 George I, Prince of Waldeck and Pyrmont (1747–1813), German Prince of Waldeck and Pyrmont
 George II, Prince of Waldeck and Pyrmont (1789–1845), German Prince of Waldeck and Pyrmont
 George Victor, Prince of Waldeck and Pyrmont (1831–1893), 3rd sovereign Prince of the German state of Waldeck and Pyrmont
 Henry VII, Count of Waldeck (died after 1442), Count of Waldeck
 Jean-Frédéric Waldeck (c. 1766–1875), French antiquarian, cartographer, artist and explorer
 Josias II, Count of Waldeck-Wildungen (1636–1669), Count of Waldeck-Wildungen
 Josias, Hereditary Prince of Waldeck and Pyrmont (1896–1967), German heir apparent to the throne of the Principality of Waldeck and Pyrmont and a General in the SS
 Karl August, Prince of Waldeck and Pyrmont (1704–1763), Commander of the Dutch forces in the War of Austrian Succession
 Klaus Waldeck, Austrian musician
 Magdalene of Waldeck-Wildungen (1558–1599), daughter of Philip IV of Waldeck-Wildungen
 Philip III, Count of Waldeck (1486–1539), Count of Waldeck-Eisenberg
 Philip IV, Count of Waldeck (1493–1574), Count of Waldeck-Wildungen
 Pierre Waldeck-Rousseau (1846–1904), French Republican statesman
 Prince Georg Friedrich of Waldeck (1620–1692), German and Dutch Field Marshal
 Prince Wolrad of Waldeck and Pyrmont (1892–1914), youngest child of George Victor, Prince of Waldeck and Pyrmont
 Princess Caroline of Waldeck and Pyrmont (1748–1782), Duchess consort of Courland
 Princess Elisabeth of Waldeck and Pyrmont (1873–1961), youngest daughter of George Victor, Prince of Waldeck and Pyrmont
 Princess Helena of Waldeck and Pyrmont (1861–1922), German-born princess, a member of the British Royal Family by marriage
 Princess Helena of Waldeck and Pyrmont (1899–1948), only daughter of Friedrich, Prince of Waldeck and Pyrmont
 Princess Hermine of Waldeck and Pyrmont (1827–1910), second daughter of George II, Prince of Waldeck and Pyrmont
 Princess Ida of Waldeck and Pyrmont (1796–1869), member of the House of Waldeck and Pyrmont and a Princess of Waldeck and Pyrmont, Germany
 Princess Marie of Waldeck and Pyrmont (1857–1882), third daughter of George Victor, Prince of Waldeck and Pyrmont
 Princess Pauline of Waldeck and Pyrmont (1855–1925), member of the House of Waldeck and Pyrmont and a Princess of Waldeck and Pyrmont
 R. G. Waldeck (1898–1982), also known as Rosie Waldeck, German-born American author
 René Waldeck-Rousseau, father (1809–1882), French politician
 Sophie of Waldeck (1662–1702), Princess of Waldech by birth and by marriage Duchess of Saxe-Hildburghausen, Germany
 Waldeck L'Huillier (1905–1986), a French politician.
 Waldeck Rochet (1905–1983), French politician
 Wittekind, Prince of Waldeck and Pyrmont (born 1936), head of the House of Waldeck and Pyrmont
 Wolrad I, Count of Waldeck (1399–1475), son of Count Henry VII of Waldeck